Paul Mavima is Zimbabwe's Minister of Public Service, Labour and Social Welfare and a member of Zanu-PF. He has also served as the Minister of Primary and Secondary Education and the Deputy Minister of Primary and Secondary Education in the Emmerson Mnangagwa government.

Education and career
Mavima completed a Ph.D. in Public Administration from Florida State University in 1999. After finishing his Ph.D., he worked at the Florida Legislature's Office of Program Policy Analysis and Government Accountability. He returned to Zimbabwe and was employed as the Principal Director in the government's Office of Deputy Prime Minister in 2009. He first ran for election in 2013.

References

Living people
ZANU–PF politicians
Government ministers of Zimbabwe
Place of birth missing (living people)
1963 births